David Sopher (1 February 1929 – 14 February 2019) was an Indian water polo player. He competed in the men's tournament at the 1952 Summer Olympics.

References

External links 

1929 births
2019 deaths
Indian male water polo players
Olympic water polo players of India
Water polo players at the 1952 Summer Olympics
Sportspeople from Mumbai